Bullard High School is a public high school located on the southern edge of the city of Bullard, Texas in Cherokee County, United States. It is classified as a 4A school by the UIL. The school is a part of the Bullard Independent School District that serves students in southern Smith County and northern Cherokee County. In 2015, the school was rated "Met Standard" by the Texas Education Agency.

Athletics
The Bullard Panthers compete in the following sports:

Baseball
Basketball
Cross Country
Football
Golf
Powerlifting
Softball
Tennis
Track and Field
Volleyball
Soccer

State Titles
Boys Golf 
1976(B), 1980(1A)
Girls Golf 
1984(2A), 1985(2A), 1986(2A), 1991(2A), 1992(2A)
Boys Powerlifting (Hunter Phelps)
2014 (3A), 2015 (3A)

Notable alumni
Nick Rumbelow, baseball player

References

External links
Bullard ISD website

Public high schools in Texas
Schools in Cherokee County, Texas